Tak and the Power of Juju is an American CGI animated television series that aired for two seasons from August 31, 2007, to January 24, 2009. Loosely based on the 2003 video game of the same name, the show consists of two eleven-minute stories per half-hour episode. It was co-produced by THQ and Nickelodeon. The series was produced by Nick Jennings and directed, among others, by Mark Risley, Jim Schumann, and Heiko Drengenberg. It was the first CGI series to be directly overseen by Nickelodeon Animation Studio.

Characters

Main
 Tak (voiced by Hal Sparks replacing Jason Marsden) has the ability to summon a magic power, which the Jujus (magical creatures) bestowed upon him to serve as a link between his and their realms (after Tak saved the Jujus from Darkness Juju). Tak tends to be the smarter of the group, but has his mishaps when it comes to practicing his Juju power. Whenever Lok gets himself into trouble Tak is the first one on the scene to save him. He is a 14-year-old apprentice who lives with his mentor Jibolba. Little is known about Tak's parents except that his mother was the Aurora Juju and his father was a Pupununu. He was originally voiced by Jason Marsden.
 Jeera (voiced by Kari Wahlgren) is Tak's fun-loving best friend and the same age as him. She is a tomboy and will often punch Tak as a sign of endearment or annoyance. It is heavily implied that she has romantic feelings for Tak. Jeera is the younger of the Chief's two daughters; her older sister Zaria is next in line for the throne and never lets Jeera forget it. So far, the only game she appears in is Tak and the Guardians of Gross.
 Banutu Jibolba (voiced by Lloyd Sherr) is Tak's guardian and mentor is the shaman of the Pupununu tribe. He is 177 years old. He was originally voiced by John Kassir.
 The Chief (voiced by Maurice LaMarche) is the leader of the Pupununu and father of Jeera and Zaria. A bumbling but ultimately harmless figurehead, he constantly gets furious at Tak due to his mistakes in the use of his Juju power yet often asks Tak to use his powers to help the village (but mainly to help him). He is mainly cheerful, and kind of a scatterbrain. He loves his tribe and is distinguished by his voice and his large belly. His real name is not mentioned.
 Lok (voiced by Patrick Warburton) is the resident warrior of the village, Lok is more talk than action and, in fact, his cowardice usually gets the better of him. He'd rather make up a story (mostly from stating it was him and not Tak who saved the village) to save face than do the actual dangerous deed. He often refers to himself in third person.
 Keeko (voiced by John DiMaggio) is a careless, daydreaming, laid-back orphan. Keeko is best friends with Tak and Jeera. He has no parents and lives in a cave. His only memories of his parents is the song he whistles. He creates different inventions in the series and some of them rarely work.
 Linda is a talking, bright sheep who walks on two legs, and at several times on all of four, who is a very loyal and close friend of Tak (her only friend) to whom her heart is open to, as well as soft spot for. She is often ridiculed by her family for standing on two legs, instead of on all fours, but is not ridiculed by Tak. She has great interest in dancing.
 Zaria (voiced by Dannah Feinglass) is Jeera's 18-year-old sister. She is the next one to inherit the throne and never let Jeera forget it. She is a preppy, girly, spoiled, bossy fashionista and has the largest feet in the village. She constantly brags that she is the most beautiful in all the tribe (and explains she has the most beautiful feet in the world), but Jeera and Tak think she's all that of herself and just plain mean. Psychic Juju revealed that she will not be the future chief. Zaria is based on Paris Hilton.
 Slog (voiced by Megan Cavanagh) is a heavy-set woman who is incredibly strong. She has a "man-lady" voice. She has a big crush on Lok.
 Blod Oongatchaka (voiced by Greg Cipes) and Bleeta (voiced by Moira Quirk) are the children of the tribe's wealthiest family, the Oongachakas. Blod and Bleeta are known to assist Tak and Jeera in their adventures. Blod is a hot-headed oddball and likes to brag about his wealth and has taken a romantic liking to Zaria, but she hates him. Bleeta is quite the opposite, always optimistic and curious about the world outside of her lifestyle and is Jeera's female best friend. They are commonly in the form of blue sheep, as seen in one episode.
 Chaka and Oonga Oongachaka are the parents of Blod and Bleeta and friends of the Chief.
 Navis is Jeera's pet Gratch. She obtains it in "The Littlest Gratch" and can be seen again in "Girls Only", "Mofather", "Double Tak", "Break This" and "Testing Jibolba".
 The Pupununu Tribe – Mindless follower of Chief and Lok who play a similar role to Shy Guys and Waddle Dees in the show.
 Traloc (voiced by Jeff Bennett, originally named "Tlaloc") is the evil shaman from the videogame series who only appears in "A Shaman's Shaman". He comes to the village and attempts to become the new high shaman by squeezing Jibolba out and to be treated like royalty, but Tak and Jibolba revealed his scheme to Pupununu by showing he used Ginto Powder (a substance Jibolba is allergic to) to manipulate his magic, Jibolba return as the high shaman and made Tak turn Traloc into a donkey (originally a sheep in the games) and plans his return, though he would not appear again. He appears again in "Nicktoons: Globs of Doom" voiced again by Rob Paulsen.

Jujus
Jujus are very weird magical creatures that Tak calls upon whenever he's in need of them. Each of the Jujus reside in their own part of the Juju Realm. Among the Jujus featured in this series are:
 Aurora Juju is Tak's mother and she created the crystal that powers Tak's staff. She was Darkness Juju's fiancé but left him and married a man from the Pupununu tribe. Not much is to be known of her, though it revealed in "Destiny Schmestiny" that she might still be alive and in hiding as Darkness Juju revealed that she had 'returned' to him thought it proven not to be her. She appears to be some sort of bug Juju.
 Belly Juju is a hungry Juju whose stomach has taken over for his mouth. The stomach controls the body because the head has no brain.
 Big Boss Juju is a fiery rock monster who is the mightiest Juju in the Juju Realm. It is so powerful, even other Jujus fear him. A long-forgotten Juju tradition has the Pupununu Chief fighting the Big Boss Juju as a way of evading world annihilation. It will target whoever is wearing the crown during the fight.
 Bug Juju (voiced by Wayne Knight) is a small Juju that resembles a beetle. He has command over insects and loves to write autobiographical musicals.
 Bulldrafish is a monster that has three heads (an aggressive bull head named Henry/George, a female dragon head named Doris who can breathe blue fire, and a fish head named Gillbert), a dragon-like body, and a fish tail. It is the pet of Judge Juju and serves as one of her enforcers of the law. It is also referred to in the credits as the Drykopf.
 Caged Juju is a cranky, horned Juju that lives in a cage and would dearly love to eat Tak. Or anyone else, for that matter.
 Darkness Juju is a Juju that looks a bit like an obese version of the Devil, who sought the power of the crystal that came into Tak's possession. He was Aurora Juju's fiancé until she ran off with a man from the Pupununu tribe and had Tak.
 Dinky Juju is a short-tempered Juju with powerful magic. Unlike the game, he is restored with a deep voice. He is an adult, but many confuse him for a baby because of his small size.
 Devour Brothers – They star in the episode "Sans Sheriff".  They're causing trouble in the Juju Realm. They are the brothers of Caged Juju.
 Feet Juju are a pair of large, blue feet (and legs) that likes to dance. They seem to be recolored versions of the Giant Misunderstanding Juju.
 Gremlin Juju – There is an assortment of these short anglerfish-faced creatures. Some of them serve as the law enforcement of the Jujus.
 Guess Who Juju is an imaginary Juju that is really Tak just wearing the most clever of disguises.
 Head Juju is a green floating head with arms that has a southern accent. He lives in the Realm of Scrolls and is the coach of the professional Gratchball team in the Juju realm.
 Judge Juju is a corn Juju dressed as a judge. Despite sounding like a man, Judge Juju is actually a woman.
 Killjoy Juju is a one-eyed Juju known for stopping parties. She is the wife of Party Juju. She often mistakes Tak for a girl.
 Love Juju is a short, floating, mermaid Juju that wears an inner tube and wields a snorkel as if it was her wand. The Pupununu always throw a festival in her honor. She one time left a hole in the Chief's stomach when she ended up displeased in one of the past festivals.
 Mayhem Juju is a cute but mischievous little creature that Tak and Jeera take home as a pet in the episode "New Pet". It has three musical horns on its head that sound off when it summons a magical power. Mayhem Juju also has the power to disappear and reappear at any time.
 Party Juju (voiced by Rob Paulsen) – Also known as Dead Juju, Party Juju is a skeleton Juju who is known to start parties and even enjoys parties. Only the powers of his wife, Killjoy Juju can undo the effects of his powers.
 Phobia Juju is a floating brain Juju that helps the Pupununu tribe every year to overcome their fears. He appears in the episode "Shrink A Dink".
 Psychic Juju (voiced by S. Scott Bullock) – Also known as Mind-Reader Juju, Psychic Juju is a large-headed genie-like Juju with psychic powers and precognition abilities. He always demands "Silence" when he doesn't want to be interrupted when he is giving his latest precognition. He claims to know everything, and "even if I don't know the answer, how would you know?"
 Pugnacious Juju is a three-armed retired boxer Juju. He tried to helped Chief into training him to fight the Big Boss Juju.
 Really, Really, Revolting Juju is a gross-looking Juju. She is the sister of Repugnant Juju and Repulsive Juju.
 Repugnant Juju is a gross-looking Juju. She is the sister of Repulsive Juju and Really, Really Revolting Juju.
 Repulsive Juju is a gross-looking Juju. He is the younger brother of Repugnant Juju and Really, Really, Revolting Juju. Like his siblings he resembles a fat dinosaur covered with holes that blow disgusting gasses. He also has a large head and large eyestalks. He seems to be the friendliest JuJu and is the most common Juju to appear. He and Tak are friends. He later evolves and becomes grosser, fatter, and very blob-like.
 Roadkill Juju is a short peg-legged Juju that loves being run over by J-Runners.
 Spider Juju is a spider Juju with a Parisian accent whose diet seems to consist mainly of human beings. On one occasion, Tak summoned him to get rid of Zaria when she was in charge during the Chief's vacation.
 Two-Headed Juju are a conjoined twin Juju.
 Vendor Juju is an orange octopus/jar-like Juju that can sell anything from within its body. He is where Tak and Jeera got the Motiki from.

Episodes

Home media
Tak and the Power of Juju: The Trouble with Magic was released on June 24, 2008, and contained the episodes Woodiefest, Loser, A Shaman's Shaman, The Gift, The Three Chiefs, The Party, The Beast, To Zaria with Love, Girls Only, and Secession.

Tak and the Power of Juju: Season 1 was released on October 17, 2011, and contains all 26 episodes.

On September 22, 2021, the series was added to Paramount+, though originally reported for August.

KCA preview 
During the Nickelodeon 2007 Kids' Choice Awards, hosted by Justin Timberlake, a preview was shown of the new show in Nick.com. The site included the preview, a character page and a story page minimally different from the game.

Differences from the games 
 Jason Marsden, who voiced Tak in the video game, did not reprise his role, and had been replaced by Hal Sparks.
 Lloyd Sherr voices Banutu Jibolba, who was previously voiced by John Kassir in the video game.
 Patrick Warburton is the only cast member from the games to reprise his role as Lok from the video game.
 In the series, Tak has brown hair with a middle parting, similar to his appearance in Tak 2, while in the original game his hair is black and in a bowl cut.
 Preview commercials on Nickelodeon clearly display the name of Tak's tribe. For the series, it is written "Pupununu". In the series of video games, it was "Pupanunu".
 In the television series, Dead Juju is instead called Party Juju with Rob Paulsen reprising the role. Also, Mind-Reader Juju is called Psychic Juju here with S. Scott Bullock voicing him instead of Paulsen.
 Tlaloc, the antagonist in the video games, is named Traloc in the show. Jeff Bennett voices him in the series instead of Rob Paulsen, though he would reprise the role for SpongeBob SquarePants featuring Nicktoons: Globs of Doom.
 The only Jujus and characters from the original games that never appeared were the Two-Headed Juju, Moon Juju, Fauna and Flora, and Tlaloc's minions Pins and Needles.
 The canonicity of the game series and television series with respect to one another is ambiguous.

Reception
Common Sense Media rated the show a 3 out of 5 stars, stating "Based on a popular Nickelodeon video game, Tak and the Power of Juju is an entertaining CG-animated series full of colorful characters and outlandish scenarios sure to entertain older school-age kids and young tweens. Tak's mix of good intentions and general mischief lays the groundwork for plenty of fun in each episode, and parents will like that there's not much to worry about here, aside from mild, typical cartoon violence. Just be ready for your kids to begging for the tie-in games once they've developed an affection for the jungle-dwelling cast."

See also

 Tak and the Power of Juju

References

External links 
 Advanced Review: AnimationInsider.net
 
 

Tak and the Power of Juju
2000s American animated television series
2007 American television series debuts
2009 American television series endings
2000s Nickelodeon original programming
American children's animated action television series
American children's animated adventure television series
American children's animated comedy television series
American children's animated fantasy television series
Animated series based on video games
Anime-influenced Western animated television series
American computer-animated television series
English-language television shows
Nicktoons
Teen animated television series